Sophie Heathcote (25 December 1972 – 4 January 2006) was an Australian actor, known for her role in film Reckless Kelly and for her regular television serial roles, including A Country Practice, Water Rats  and Grass Roots

Biography 
Heathcote was born in Melbourne on 25 December 1972. She began her acting career with a regular role in medical drama series A Country Practice as Stephanie "Steve" Brennan appearing in 117 episodes from 1990 to 1991.

Professional training
She graduated from Australia's National Institute of Dramatic Art (NIDA) in late 1994. Acting roles included roles in Bordertown, GP and Soldier Soldier. Subsequent to this she took the ongoing role of Senior Constable Fiona Cassidy in Water Rats (1996–97), followed by a role in the Australian Broadcasting Corporation series Raw FM (1997) in which she played sexy lesbian dancer Sam, a role she said challenged her more than anything she had done since leaving NIDA. She won an AFI award in 2000 for her role in ABC's Grass Roots.

Personal life
Along with her husband she established an annual fundraising event that raises $500,000 a year for the neonatal unit at the Royal Children's Hospital. The staff there saved the life of their first child, Madeleine, who is believed to have suffered respiratory problems. The couple moved to the US in 2005, basing themselves in New York City.

Death
Heathcote died suddenly on 4 January 2006 in Connecticut, reportedly from an aneurysm. She had also been suffering from skin and pancreatic cancer.

Her funeral was held on 18 January 2006 at St Peter's Church in Toorak, Victoria, Australia. She was survived by her husband, their daughter, and their son. Heathcote is buried at Sorrento Cemetery on the Mornington Peninsula.

Filmography

See also
Heathcote (surname)

References

External links
 

1972 births
2006 deaths
Australian film actresses
Australian television actresses
Actresses from Melbourne
National Institute of Dramatic Art alumni
Deaths from aneurysm